Romeo Filipović (born 31 March 1986) is a German-born Croatian retired football player, who finished his career in 2017.

Club career
A much-travelled player, Filipović had spells in Austria with SV Spittal/Drau, in Scotland with Ayr United and in the United States with OC Blues

References

External links
 
 Player profile - Arizona United

1986 births
Living people
People from Recklinghausen
Sportspeople from Münster (region)
Association football midfielders
Croatian footballers
VfB Homberg players
FC U Craiova 1948 players
SV Spittal players
Al-Ahli SC (Amman) players
FK Željezničar Sarajevo players
Ayr United F.C. players
Bontang F.C. players
NK Karlovac players
FK Sloboda Tuzla players
FC Mendrisio players
FC Koper players
Olimpia Grudziądz players
Orange County SC players
Phoenix Rising FC players
Persela Lamongan players
Oberliga (football) players
Austrian Regionalliga players
Indonesian Premier League players
Croatian Football League players
Premier League of Bosnia and Herzegovina players
Slovenian PrvaLiga players
USL Championship players
Liga 1 (Indonesia) players
Croatian expatriate footballers
Expatriate footballers in Germany
Croatian expatriate sportspeople in Germany
Expatriate footballers in Romania
Croatian expatriate sportspeople in Romania
Expatriate footballers in Austria
Croatian expatriate sportspeople in Austria
Expatriate footballers in Jordan
Croatian expatriate sportspeople in Jordan
Expatriate footballers in Bosnia and Herzegovina
Croatian expatriate sportspeople in Bosnia and Herzegovina
Expatriate footballers in Scotland
Croatian expatriate sportspeople in Scotland
Expatriate footballers in Indonesia
Croatian expatriate sportspeople in Indonesia
Expatriate footballers in Switzerland
Croatian expatriate sportspeople in Switzerland
Expatriate footballers in Slovenia
Croatian expatriate sportspeople in Slovenia
Expatriate footballers in Poland
Croatian expatriate sportspeople in Poland
Expatriate soccer players in the United States
Croatian expatriate sportspeople in the United States